Shan State Special Region 4, commonly known as Mongla area or Lesser Mongla area, is a special region administrated by Peace and Solidarity Committee (PSC) of Shan State-East. It covers territories of the entire Mong La Township, eastern part of Mong Hpayak Township and to the north borders the northern part of Wa State.

The indigenous peoples of this region are Blang, Pyin, Akha, Hani, Lahu and Tai Lue people, etc. while the lingua franca is Mandarin Chinese.

It was established by sent-down youth U Sai Leun (born Lin Mingxian). Since its active involvement into casinos and endangered wild-animal trafficking, it has been an issue for the Chinese government, which closed the  several times. It also sent police cross border to destruct a casino there, under the acknowledgement of Burmese government. This special region is notorious in southwest Yunnan as they send casino advertisement spam SMS to Chinese cellphones. Organized crime used to be common in this region.

Sai Leun maintained a good relationship with Burmese army (Tatmadaw) as the Tatmadaw units benefit financially from it.

Name
Mongla, Mengla or Meungla are different Romanization of the same Tai word, both the e and the o here should be pronounced like the Scottish accent pronunciation of u in bucks. Thus, to differentiate Mengla County in China and Mong La Township/settlement in Myanmar the locals call the former Greater Mengla/Mongla while the latter Lesser Mongla/Mengla.

Administrative divisions
Mengla District 勐拉地区
Nanban District 南板地区
Sele District 色勒地区

References

Citations
 边城勐拉，中缅交界处的法外之地 - New York Times

External links
Mongla Forum

Shan State
Tai Lue language
Townships of Myanmar